John Jarvis was a set decorator. He was nominated for an Academy Award in the category Best Art Direction for the film Knights of the Round Table.

Selected filmography
 Knights of the Round Table (1953)

References

External links

Year of birth missing
Possibly living people
Set decorators